Ross Becker is a journalist who primarily works in television, radio, and digital. He is the president and CEO of TvNewsmentor.com, dedicated to growing and mentoring talent. He is also the founding partner of Top News Talent, LLC, a coaching, training and representation company for broadcast, and digital journalists.

Career 
Becker began his career in broadcasting in 1975 as a reporter at WFRV-TV in Green Bay, Wisconsin, before moving in 1977 to WTHR-TV in Indianapolis as a weekend anchor and field reporter. He then moved to KCBS-TV (then-known as KNXT) in Los Angeles in 1980 as a reporter, eventually becoming head of the Investigative Team and weekend anchor, as well as a host of a short-lived 7 p.m. newscast. He received three Emmys for coverage of the Cerritos plane crash and Southern California windstorms. He also received six Golden Mike Awards and the AP Mark Twain Award for news writing. During his tenure at KCBS, he served two years as President of the Radio/TV News Association of Southern California. In 1990, Becker moved on to KCOP-TV to anchor the station's only newscast, replacing Warren Olney. At KCOP, he received an Emmy Award for coverage of the Reginald Oliver Denny beating, which started the L.A. area riots.

In 1995, Becker quit KCOP, complaining about "sold-out, disgusting, tabloid" journalism in Los Angeles. In January 1996, Becker was hired as a freelance journalist and conducted a 90-minute interview with O. J. Simpson. It was the first interview with Simpson following his acquittal on murder charges. The interview was controversial at the time because its videotape got distributed for sale instead of airing on "free" television or cable. During the interview, Becker agreed not to ask about Simpson's children, finances, or the then-pending civil lawsuit. However, Becker disclosed this at the beginning of the interview and ultimately questioned him about those subjects. In the video, Simpson blamed people "in Faye Resnick's circle" for the murder and accused Mark Fuhrman of planting evidence related to Simpson's guilt. Many television stations and the National Enquirer, which printed many details about the trial, refused to carry advertising for the video.

After conducting the interview, Becker took a break from big-city television news. In 1995, Becker and his wife, Linda, purchased three radio stations in Kentucky. These included WIEL-AM Elizabethtown, WKMO in Lebanon Junction, and WRZI-FM in Hodgenville. These got sold to Commonwealth Broadcasting in 2000, and Becker jumped back into the broadcast news business when he accepted a position as an anchor for MSNBC in 2001. The following year, he returned to local news when he joined KTNV-TV in Las Vegas as its evening anchor. Becker left KTNV in December 2004 to pursue other opportunities. He returned to Los Angeles in 2005 as a freelance reporter for KNBC before being hired full-time. He left KNBC at the end of 2006 to join KTVX-TV in Salt Lake City, Utah, as an evening anchor. He left the station on December 31, 2009, and joined KUSI-TV in San Diego. At KUSI, he was a featured reporter and co-anchor of the 11 p.m. newscast. At the end of 2016, Becker left KUSI to become the news director for KMIR-TV in Palm Springs, California. Becker left KMIR in January 2018. He became the lead anchor for KAAL in Rochester, Minnesota, in January 2019, before announcing his departure in August 2021.

Becker is the past president of the Board of Directors of APTRA, the Associated Press TV and Radio Association which serves 12 western states as a liaison with the Associated Press.

References

External links
Ross Becker's web site
Ross Becker's KTVX biography

American television journalists
Television anchors from Los Angeles
Television anchors from Salt Lake City
Television anchors from Indianapolis
Television anchors from Las Vegas
Year of birth missing (living people)
Living people
American male journalists